Major-General Sir Walter Joseph Constable-Maxwell-Scott, 1st Baronet  (10 April 1875 – 3 April 1954) was a senior British Army officer.

Military career
Educated at Stonyhurst College, Constable-Maxwell-Scott transferred from the militia into the Cameronians (Scottish Rifles) on 11 January 1899. He saw action in the Tirah campaign, the Second Boer War and the First World War for which he was appointed a Companion of the Distinguished Service Order. After the war he became commander of the 132nd Infantry Brigade in February 1923, commander of the 1st Rhine Brigade in April 1924 and General Officer Commanding 52nd (Lowland) Infantry Division in March 1930 before retiring in March 1934.

He inherited Abbotsford House on the death of his mother, Mary Monica Maxwell-Scott, in March 1920.

Family
In March 1918 he married Mairi Richmond Macdougall; they had two daughters (Patricia Maxwell-Scott and Dame Jean Maxwell-Scott). Following the death of his first wife, he married Marie Louise St. Paul Logan in June 1928.

References

|-

1875 births
1954 deaths
British Army personnel of World War I
British Army major generals
Companions of the Order of the Bath
Companions of the Distinguished Service Order
Cameronians officers
People educated at Stonyhurst College
Scott family of Abbotsford